Daruvar is a spa town and municipality in Slavonia, northeastern Croatia with a population of 8,567. The area including the surrounding villages (Dar. Vinogradi, Doljani, Donji Daruvar, Gornji Daruvar, Lipovac Majur, Ljudevit Selo, Markovac, and Vrbovac) has a population of 11,633 as of 2011. It is located on the foothills of Papuk mountain and along the Toplica River. The main political and cultural centre of the Czech national minority in Croatia, it has a winemaking tradition reportedly dating back more than 2,000 years.

Geography
 Coordinates: 
 Area: 64 km2
 Altitude: 190 m

Daruvar is located 125 km from Zagreb, the national capital, and 130 km from Osijek, the main city of Slavonia to the east. The closest cities are Pakrac, Lipik, Novska, Križevci, Bjelovar, and Virovitica.

Administration
Daruvar is located in the Bjelovar-Bilogora County. The list of settlements within the city limits is:
 Daruvar, population 8,567
 Daruvarski Vinogradi, population 164
 Doljani, population 759
 Donji Daruvar, population 731
 Gornji Daruvar, population 436
 Lipovac Majur, population 83
 Ljudevit Selo, population 252
 Markovac, population 80
 Vrbovac, population 561

Etymology
Its name is a conjunction of the Hungarian words daru and vár.

History

Archaeological findings here, (stone axes), could be traced back to the Stone Age. The history of Daruvar could be traced to the 4th century BC, when the first organized habitation emerged near the warm geothermal spas in today's Daruvar valley. Celtic - Pannonian tribes living here and familiar with water treatments benefiting health, were Iassi, (meaning healers), so called by both Greek and Roman writers.

As allies of the Roman Empire, the tribes provided support to Emperor Augustus during the siege of Siscia, (today's Sisak), and in the year 35, Iassi were granted local autonomy known as Res Publica Iasorum. The center of it was Aquae Balissae, meaning very strong springs. In the year 124, during the reign of Hadrian, the area gained additional autonomy as Municipium Iassorum. Stretching between the rivers Sava and Drava, on the roads which ran between Siscia-Mursa, (Sisak- Osijek), Salona–Aquincum, and Sirmium–Poetovio, it was easy to access. As did Hadrian, emperors Marcus Aurelius, Commodus, Septimius Severus, and Constantine I all visited Aquae Balissae's thermal complex, its decorated temple, its forum, and its (though not as big as the one in Pula) amphitheatre. After the fall of Western Roman Empire and the destruction of local tribes by Avar Kaghanate in 6th century this area was resettled by Croats, a Slavic tribe that came to the Balkans in 7th century.

In the 11th century the region became part of a mightier entity, that of the rapidly growing and politically important city of Križevci. Within, it became part of the archdiocese of Zagreb mentioned by legislators for the first time in 1334. Since the city was on a busy crossroads, there were four trading points within the valley — Četvrtkovac, Dimičkovine, Podborje, and Toplice (toplice =  "spas" in Croatian). And, as it was more than millennium ago, pleasant spas kept attracting people. The population in that period was exclusively Catholic.

In the 15th and 16th centuries, all that changed. Expansion of the Ottoman Empire disrupted the steady development, and Turks occupied lands here in 1543. The Monastery of St King Ladislaus was degraded, becoming a Turkish defensive post looking into the Krajina, military zone created to protect the Habsburg Empire just west of the city. Local people fled from Turks. Turks were expelled in 1699 and the now ethnically mixed area came under the rule of Vienna in 1745. Podborje, Sirač, and Pakrac were bought by count Antun Janković who in 1771 renamed Podborje as Daruvar, (daru = "crane" in Hungarian), after a building of his own called the Crane's castle. In 1837 Daruvar was declared a free city by decree of king Ferdinand I. Empty lands were repopulated by people skilled in crafts, trade, and agriculture from around Croatia and beyond. Germans, Hungarians, Czechs, Italians (around so called Little Italy), and others were invited to come. In the late 19th and early 20th century, Daruvar was part of the Požega County of the Kingdom of Croatia-Slavonia. Parts of Daruvar's suburbs were briefly captured by militants from the Serbian Autonomous Oblast of Western Slavonia during the Croatian War of Independence.

Climate

Demographics
According to the census of 2011, the population of the Daruvar municipality (township) was 11,633. In ethnic terms, 61.28% are Croats, 21.36% Czechs, 12.28% Serbs, and 0.98% Hungarians. As for the religion, 75.49% are Catholics, 10.23% Orthodox, and 7.62% are agnostics and atheists.

The Czech population is of significant size having its own newspaper, schools, societies and clubs (Česká beseda or 'Czech word', Jednota or 'Unity' in Czech), and publishing company. The entire area (Veliki Zdenci, Grubišno Polje, Končanica), is actually bilingual with Czech being the second official language. There are numerous local ethnic festivities celebrating important points in different cultures — youth, harvest etc. with the most interesting and picturesque that of the Czech minority.

Spas

Water treatments benefiting health were well known to mentioned Iassi tribes here almost 2,500 years ago, later widely used by Romans and in the Middle Ages. In 1772 the owner of the area Antun Janković started building around the springs, envisioning correctly that the town might become a healing, leisure, and recreation center again as it was through the course of history. He erected numerous buildings, many of them still functional (Anton's spa, Ivan's spa). After 1897 the newly opened railroad brought new visitors. Restaurant Teresa, Swiss villa, Villa Arcadia, and Big Mud Spa with its prominent dome and today well known city mark were all built during the turn of 19 and 20th century.

Daruvarske Toplice is a special hospital complex for rehabilitation specializing in treatment of female fertility (primary and secondary sterility), with two clinics for esthetic surgery. Warm waters (33 to 47 °C) are also used in postoperative rehabilitation, treatment of inflammations, rheumatism, the trauma of bones, hips, head, spine, and locomotion. More spas are around Pakrac and Lipik, where there is also a mineral water bottling plant. The park within the complex is positioned containing 65 different kind of trees such as a 250-year-old Ginkgo tree from China, Variegatum from Arizona, and others. Hotel Termal, renovated and extended in 1996, is also here. A smaller hotel, Balisse, is a few minutes walking distance away in the traffic-friendly downtown.

Tourism
The area is rich in monuments. Historic Kistalovac, Pavlovina, Sirač, Bagenovać, Dobra Kuća, and Stupčanica are examples of numerous local castles belonging to the Croatian nobility of the times passed by. Franciscan monasteries like those of St. Margareth, St. Ana, St. Three Kings, and the Church of Holy Trinity are witnesses of the rich religious culture.

Economy

German people who came here in the 18th century as well as Czechs in the 19th were the keystone of the revival participating in agriculture, food processing plants, culture, and education. The development was accelerated at the turn of the century by being connected to the railroad track from Banova Jaruga to Barcs in Hungary. An important historic moment in 1897 was witnessed by the emperor Franz Joseph himself. Since 1840 a brewery is operating here producing today more than 250,000 hectoliters of beer based upon an old and famous Czech recipes, with Old Bohemian (Staročeško pivo) brand being the most known. Zdenka of Veliki Zdenci is well known for its milk and melted cheese processing plant.

Fish is cultivated in artificial lakes around Končanica and processed within Irida. Here are local high quality vines as Graševina (ranking the highest), Rhein Riesling, Chardonnay, and Sauvignon. Here fruit, maize, wheat, meat, and other agriculture products are produced for local, national, and wider markets. Dalit, created in 1905, is a metal processing plant, once one of the biggest in what was once Yugoslavia, employing today 320, but in the late 1970s almost 2,000 people. A flat glass factory is in Lipik. There are small graphics and printing (Daruvarska Tiskara d.d., Logos) facilities and the textile plant Vesna, which employs around 200. Growing is the importance of trade, tourism, and communication. 2300 people are employed, one-third of them women.

Education
The first school was opened in 1856. A school for women was opened here in 1866.

Notable people
Eva Fischer - oil artist
David Frankfurter - Croatian Jew known for assassinating Swiss branch leader of the German NSDAP Wilhelm Gustloff in 1936 in Davos, Switzerland

See also
List of Croatian municipalities with minority languages in official use

References

Bibliography

External links

 Daruvar official site 
 Daruvar city portal 
 Daruvarski Portfolio 

 
Spa towns in Croatia
Cities and towns in Croatia
Populated places in Bjelovar-Bilogora County
Požega County
Slavonia
Pannonia Superior